Endura S.A. is Swiss watch manufacturer founded in 1966 by General Watch Company (GWC) in Biel/Bienne, Switzerland, for the purpose of manufacturing watches under "private label".  This company was also part of the merger between ASUAG and  SSIH into SMH, now the Swatch Group. Now attached to  ETA SA Manufacture horlogère Suisse, Endura SA is the private label and licensing division of the Swatch Group.

References
Swatch Group website's Endura page

Notes

External links
 

Watch manufacturing companies of Switzerland
Manufacturing companies established in 1966